Cristián Omar Díaz (born November 3, 1986 in San Miguel de Tucumán) is an Argentine footballer who plays for Deportivo Morón in the Primera B Metropolitana.

Career

Club
Among his achievements, he finished as the league's topscorer in the 2010 Apertura tournament playing for San José with 18 goals.

In July 2010, he joined Śląsk Wrocław on a two-year contract.

Honours

References

External links
 

1986 births
Living people
Argentine footballers
Argentine expatriate footballers
Ekstraklasa players
Śląsk Wrocław players
Club San José players
Boca Unidos footballers
Central Norte players
Gimnasia y Esgrima de Concepción del Uruguay footballers
Expatriate footballers in Bolivia
Sportspeople from San Miguel de Tucumán
Expatriate footballers in Poland
Argentine expatriate sportspeople in Poland
Liga I players
Association football forwards
Argentine expatriate sportspeople in Bolivia